The Williamsburg Youth Orchestra (WYO) is a symphony orchestra and string orchestra based in Williamsburg, Virginia.  It is composed of grade schoolers, any age between 8-19.  The current director and Symphony Orchestra Conductor is Mr. David Grandis. The Strings Orchestras director is Karey Sitzler.

History
The WYO was originally formed in 1995 by local musicians and parents, who wanted a full symphonic orchestra for local instrumentalists.  Since 1995, the orchestra have played at least three concerts every year, performing at different locations almost every time.

Related groups
In addition to the two large ensembles, there are also several small chamber groups that have one large concert at the end of the season.

WYO holds a concerto competition every year.  In this competition, students perform their practiced concerto in front a board of judges and an audience, and the winners are awarded the chance to perform the concerto with the symphony orchestra at the next concert.

Orchestra Practices
The respective groups meet at a local middle school in Williamsburg for once-a-week practices on Monday.

Other occasions
The symphony orchestra has played with the Virginia Symphony Orchestra on January 27, 2008.  The concert was held at the Ferguson Center for the Arts at Christopher Newport University in a "side-by-side" concert. The symphony has played in a similar venue and format with the Williamsburg Symphonia in 2015.

Performance spaces
During the 2007-2008 season, all of the concerts (excluding the side-by-side with the Virginia Symphony Orchestra) have been in the auditorium at Warhill High School.  Previously, the concerts have been in various other places, ranging from churches to schools such as Lafayette High School and Bruton High School. Since 2010, the concerts have been held in the Kimball Theatre  in Colonial Williamsburg.

American youth orchestras
1995 establishments in Virginia
Musical groups from Virginia
Musical groups established in 1995
Youth organizations based in Virginia
Performing arts in Virginia
Non-profit organizations based in Williamsburg, Virginia